Endless Love may refer to:

Film
Endless Love (1981 film), directed by Franco Zeffirelli, based on the novel
Endless Love (2014 American film), remake of the 1981 film, directed by Shana Feste
Endless Love (2014 Burmese film), directed by Thein Han 
C'est la vie, mon chéri, English title Endless Love, a 1993 Hong Kong romantic film

Television
Endless Love (2000 TV series), a set of 4 South Korean dramas
Endless Love (2010 TV series), a Philippine drama adaptation of the Korean drama Autumn in My Heart
Endless Love (2014 TV series), a South Korean television series
Endless Love (2015 TV series) (Kara Sevda), a Turkish television drama
Endless Love (2019 TV series), a Thai television series

Literature
Endless Love, a novel by Scott Spencer

Music
Endless Love (soundtrack), soundtrack album of the 1981 film
"Endless Love" (song), theme for 1981 film, recorded by Lionel Richie and Diana Ross 
"Endless Love", theme song of the 2005 film The Myth, performed by Jackie Chan and Kim Hee-sun
"Endless Love" (Jeanette song), a 2006 song by German singer Jeanette
Endless Love, 2014 album by Norwegian singer Sivert Høyem
Endless Love, album by Indian singer Pankaj Udhas